Commins is a surname. Notable people with the surname include:

Andrew Commins (1829–1916), Irish lawyer and politician
David Commins (born 1954), American historian
Eugene D. Commins (1932–2005), American physicist
John Commins (disambiguation), several people
Kathleen Commins (1909–2003), Australian journalist
Kevin Commins (1928–1995), South African cricketer
Lanna Commins (born 1983), Thai singer
Murray Commins (born 1997), South African cricketer
Stuart Commins (born 1988), South African rugby player

See also
Commins (disambiguation)
Cummins (surname)
Commins Menapi (1977–2017), Solomon Islands footballer
Commins Mewa (born 1965), Solomon Islands politician